Interstate 69E (I-69E) is a north–south freeway running through South Texas. Once complete, the freeway will begin in Brownsville and head northward before terminating near Victoria as both I-69W and I-69E merge into I-69 toward Houston. For its entire length, I-69E runs concurrently with U.S. Highway 77 (US 77). The route currently exists in two segments: a  segment from its southern terminus in Brownsville to the Willacy–Kenedy county line and a shorter  segment south of Corpus Christi. The route has one auxiliary Interstate route, I-169 in Brownsville.

History

A stated goal of the Texas Department of Transportation's (TxDOT) I-69 initiative is that "existing suitable freeway sections of the proposed system be designated as I-69 as soon as possible". A bill was introduced and passed by the House of Representatives that allows Interstate quality sections of US 59, US 77, and US 281 to be signed as I-69 regardless of whether or not they connected to other Interstate Highways.

In August 2011, TxDOT received approval from the FHWA for a  segment of US 77 between I-37 and State Highway 44 (SH 44) near Corpus Christi and was approved by AASHTO in October 2011. Officials held a ceremony on December 5, 2011, to unveil I-69 signs on the Robstown–Corpus Christi section.

The FHWA approved the designation for the East Rio Grande Valley segment on May 24, 2013, and the Texas Transportation Commission followed suit on May 30, 2013. This action finalized the designations of not only I-69E but also of the sections of I-69C from Pharr north to the end of the US 281 freeway facility near Edinburg, and also I-2, which is a  freeway that runs from Peñitas to Harlingen and connects with I-69C and I-69E. The signage was installed in summer 2013.

Currently, the cluster consisting of the recently designated portions of I-69E, I-69C, and I-2 in the Rio Grande Valley is not connected to the national Interstate network. This situation is slated to be remedied by scheduled projects to complete I-69E along US 77 between Raymondville and Robstown the southern end of the previously signed portion of the I-69 corridor connecting with I-37 west of Corpus Christi. The Environmental Protection Agency (EPA) approval for the upgrade of the US 77 alignment to Interstate standards, including bypasses of the towns along the  routing, was obtained through a finding of no significant impact statement issued on July 13, 2012; funding for the various projects to effect the upgrades was slated to become available after 2015. During its 2019 Annual Meeting in October 2019, AASHTO approved an extension of the I-69E designation along US 77 from Farm to Market Road 892 (FM 892) to FM 2826 in Nueces County. The  extension completes I-69E from I-37 in Calallen to the north end of the Driscoll Bypass that is currently under construction. The northbound lanes opened in 2021. The southbound lanes is set to open in 2023.

Exit list

See also

References

External links 

E
U.S. Route 77
69E
Transportation in Brownsville, Texas
Transportation in Cameron County, Texas
Transportation in Kenedy County, Texas
Transportation in Kleberg County, Texas
Transportation in Nueces County, Texas
Transportation in Refugio County, Texas
Transportation in San Patricio County, Texas
Transportation in Victoria County, Texas
Transportation in Willacy County, Texas